Edwin "Teddy" Billington (July 14, 1882, Southampton – August 8, 1966, Pine Brook, New Jersey) was an American racing cyclist who competed in the early twentieth century. An all round cycling talent he competed in Cycling at the 1904 Summer Olympics and won a silver medal in the ½ mile and three bronze medals in the ¼ mile, ⅓ and the mile race. His fiercest competitors were fellow Americans Marcus Hurley and Burton Downing who mostly won gold and silver respectively.

References

External links
http://users.skynet.be/hermandw/olymp/biobi.htm

American male cyclists
Olympic bronze medalists for the United States in cycling
Olympic silver medalists for the United States in cycling
Cyclists at the 1904 Summer Olympics
1882 births
1966 deaths
Medalists at the 1904 Summer Olympics